All for our country may refer to:
"All for Our Country", the motto of Nevada, a U.S. state
"All for Our Country", a 2003 episode of the American TV show CSI:Crime Scene Investigation